Voiceless may refer to:

Voicelessness, linguistic sounds produced without vibrating the larynx
Muteness, the property of being unable to produce a voice
Aphasia, the condition of being unable to speak
A lack of power (social and political)
Voiceless (animal rights group), the animal protection institute based in Sydney, Australia
Voiceless (2015 film), an American film
Voiceless (2020 film), a Nigerian thriller film

See also
Speechless (disambiguation)